Matthias Oldofredi (born 4 March 1997), known by his stage name Filous (stylised in all lowercase), is an Austrian music producer, disc jockey and remixer.

Career 
Oldofredi first published his remixes on YouTube and SoundCloud and thus became popular. In 2015, he published the single "How Hard I Try" with James Hersey, which reached the Austrian, German and Dutch charts as well as the Belgian Ultratip charts. Filous was nominated for the Austrian Amadeus Awards 2016 in the categories "Artist of the Year", "Song of the Year" and "Electronic/Dance". On 11 January 2017, he was awarded with the European Border Breakers Award (EBBA).

Discography

Albums 

 A Producer From Vienna (2022)

EPs
 Dawn (2015)
 For Love (2017)

Singles

References

21st-century Austrian musicians
Austrian electronic musicians
Austrian DJs
Living people
1997 births
Electronic dance music DJs